Carlsbad Village station is a commuter rail station in Carlsbad, California, that is on the NCTD COASTER commuter rail line. It is one of two COASTER stations in Carlsbad (the other being Carlsbad Poinsettia station about four miles to the south), and is the last station used for northbound COASTER trains before reaching the northern terminus of Oceanside Transit Center. Along with Encinitas station, this is one of two single-track stations on the Coaster line, causing a bottleneck for rail traffic.

The former station now serves as the city's visitor center. It was listed on the National Register of Historic Places in 1993 as the Carlsbad Santa Fe Depot.

On October 7, 2013, the Amtrak Pacific Surfliner began stopping at four COASTER stations: Carlsbad Village, Carlsbad Poinsettia, Encinitas and Sorrento Valley. The Carlsbad Poinsettia and Encinitas stops were discontinued on October 9, 2017. The Carlsbad Village and Sorrento Valley stops were dropped on October 8, 2018, due to changes with the cross-ticketing arrangement with COASTER and NCTD.

References

External links

COASTER Stations

North County Transit District stations
Carlsbad, California
Former Amtrak stations in California
Railway stations in the United States opened in 1995
National Register of Historic Places in San Diego County, California
Railway stations on the National Register of Historic Places in California